Walter G. Ronald (August 18, 1857 – May 31, 1936) was an American politician in the state of Washington. He served in the Washington State Senate from 1933 to 1937. From 1933 to 1935, he was President pro tempore of the Senate.

References

Democratic Party Washington (state) state senators
1857 births
1936 deaths